The Mary E. Surratt Boarding House in Washington, D.C. was the site of meetings of conspirators to kidnap and subsequently to assassinate U.S. President Abraham Lincoln.  It was operated as a boarding house by Mary Surratt from September 1864 to April 1865.

About the house

The building, at 604 H Street NW, standing three-and-one-half stories tall, was constructed by Jonathan T. Walker in 1843. It has been described as being in the Early Republic or Federal style or in "vernacular Greek Revival" style. The building was altered in 1925 so that the first floor could be used as a commercial space.

John Surratt purchased the house from Augustus A. Gibson on December 6, 1853, and operated it as a boarding house. After her husband died in 1862, Mary Surratt chose to rent her tavern/residence in nearby Surrattsville, Maryland, to John M. Lloyd, a former Washington, D.C., policeman and Confederate sympathizer, and moved into the Washington boarding house.

In 1865, the military tribunal trying the conspirators of Lincoln's assassination heard testimony from residents at the boarding house that Surratt had regularly met with John Wilkes Booth and the Lincoln conspirators at the house. Lloyd told the tribunal that he had been told by Surratt to provide field glasses and guns to Booth and co-conspirator David Herold. It was on the basis of this evidence that Surratt was convicted and sentenced to death. For her role as a member of the Abraham Lincoln assassination conspiracy plot, she became the first woman to be executed by the United States federal government.  She was executed by hanging.

The building was listed on the U.S. National Register of Historic Places on August 11, 2009. The listing was announced as the featured listing in the National Park Service's weekly list of August 28, 2009.

In April, 2011 the house gained some attention with the release of a film about Mary Surratt, The Conspirator by director Robert Redford. , the commercial space is used as a restaurant, with karaoke rooms available.

See also
 National Register of Historic Places listings in the District of Columbia

References

Bibliography
Kauffman, Michael W. American Brutus. New York: Random House, 2004.

External links

 Wok and Roll restaurant
 Surratt House Museum
Lincoln Conspirator's Home Now Wok and Roll - Ghosts of DC blog

1843 establishments in Washington, D.C.
Assassination of Abraham Lincoln
Federal architecture in Washington, D.C.
Houses completed in 1843
Houses on the National Register of Historic Places in Washington, D.C.